"Los Dioses" is a song by Puerto Rican rapper Anuel AA and Puerto Rican singer Ozuna, released in January 22, 2021. It was released as the first single from their collaborative album Los Dioses on January 22, 2021, by Real Hasta la Muerte and Aura Music.

Music video 
The video of "Los Dioses" was released on January 22, 2021 at the same day they released the album, with the song in Anuel AA's YouTube channel. It was filmed in Miami and directed by Fernando Lugo. It kicks off with a sample of the theme for professional wrestler John Cena, before transitioning into a melodic trap record as sleek as unreleased Bugatti and Lamborghini from far in the future.

Charts

References 

2021 songs
2021 singles
Anuel AA songs
Ozuna (singer) songs
Songs written by Anuel AA
Songs written by Ozuna (singer)
Spanish-language songs